Walleye is a freshwater fish native to most of Canada and the northern United States.

Walleye may also refer to:
 Blue walleye, a subspecies of walleye that became extinct in the 1970s
 AGM-62 Walleye, a television-guided glide bomb used during the 1960s
 Wisconsin Walleye War, a 1987–1991 episode of civil unrest over the hunting and fishing rights of Chippewas outside of their reservation
 Toledo Walleye, a professional ice hockey team based in Toledo, Ohio
 Conditions relating to eyes
 Strabismus, in which the two eyes do not point in the same direction
 a variety of heterochromia, in which one eye has a white or blue-ish white iris
 eyeshine, as of the walleye fish
 Wall eye, one name for a horse's blue eye